A Picture of You may refer to:

 A Picture of You (Joe Brown song), 1962
 A Picture of You, a 2013 album by Daniel O'Donnell, or its title track
 A Picture of You, a 1981 album by Alvin Stardust, or its title track
 "A Picture of You", a song performed by country music singer Charlie Rich on the 1969 album The Fabulous Charlie Rich
 "A Picture of You", a song performed by Rick Wakeman on the 1971 album Piano Vibrations
 "A Picture of You", a 1991 song by Great Plains on the eponymous debut album Great Plains
 "A Picture of You", a song performed by Johnny Reid on the 2015 album What Love Is All About

See also
 Picture of You (disambiguation)
 Pictures of You (disambiguation)